In image processing, pixel connectivity is the way in which pixels in 2-dimensional (or hypervoxels in n-dimensional) images relate to their neighbors.

Formulation 

In order to specify a set of connectivities, the dimension  and the width of the neighborhood , must be specified. The dimension of a neighborhood is valid for any dimension . A common width is 3, which means along each dimension, the central cell will be adjacent to 1 cell on either side for all dimensions.

Let  represent a N-dimensional hypercubic neighborhood with size on each dimension of 

This implies that each element  and that at least one component 

For a given ,  will be equal to the amount of permutations of  multiplied by the number of orthants.

Let  represent the amount of elements in vector  which take the value . 

The total number of permutation of  can be represented by a multinomial as 

If any , then the vector  is shared in common between orthants.

Multiplying the number of amount of permutations by the adjusted amount of orthants yields,

Let  represent the number of elements inside of the hypersphere  within the neighborhood .  will be equal to the number of elements on the hypersphere plus all of the elements on the inner shells. Assume the ordered vectors  are assigned a coefficient  representing its place in order. Then an ordered vector  if all  are unique. Therefore  can be defined iteratively as
,

or

Ex. 

 includes the center hypervoxel, which is not included in the connectivity. Subtracting 1 yields the neighborhood connectivity,

Table of Selected Connectivities

Example 
Consider solving for 

In this scenario,  since the vector is 3-dimensional.  since there is one . Likewise, .  since . .

The basic  in the neighborhood , . Therefore,

Which matches the supplied table

Higher values of k & N 
The assumption that all  are unique does not hold for higher values of k & N. Consider , and the vectors .

For the this assumption to hold, 

At higher values of  &  , Values of   will become ambiguous. This means that specification of a given  could refer to multiple .

Types of connectivity

2-dimensional

4-connected
4-connected pixels are neighbors to every pixel that touches one of their edges. These pixels are connected horizontally and vertically. In terms of pixel coordinates, every pixel that has the coordinates

  or 

6-connected 
6-connected pixels are neighbors to every pixel that touches one of their corners (which includes pixels that touch one of their edges) in a hexagonal grid or stretcher bond rectangular grid.

There are several ways to map hexagonal tiles to integer pixel coordinates.

8-connected
8-connected pixels are neighbors to every pixel that touches one of their edges or corners. These pixels are connected horizontally, vertically, and diagonally.

3-dimensional

6-connected
6-connected pixels are neighbors to every pixel that touches one of their faces. These pixels are connected along one of the primary axes.

18-connected
18-connected pixels are neighbors to every pixel that touches one of their faces or edges. These pixels are connected along either one or two of the primary axes.

26-connected
26-connected pixels are neighbors to every pixel that touches one of their faces, edges, or corners. These pixels are connected along either one, two, or all three of the primary axes.

See also 
 Grid cell topology
 Moore neighborhood

References

Digital topology
Graph connectivity